Mansfield School District may refer to:

 Mansfield School District (Arkansas), based in Mansfield, Arkansas.
 Mansfield School District (Connecticut), based in Mansfield, Connecticut.
 Mansfield School District (Massachusetts), based in Mansfield, Massachusetts.
 Mansfield Public Schools, based in Mansfield Township, Burlington County, New Jersey.
 Mansfield Township School District, based in Mansfield Township, Warren County, New Jersey.
 Mansfield City School District, based in Mansfield, Ohio.
 Mansfield Independent School District, based in Mansfield, Texas.
 Mansfield School District (Washington), based in Mansfield, Washington.